Bodo Kachari Welfare Autonomous Council, (BKWAC), is an autonomous council in the Indian state of Assam, for the development and protection of ethnic Bodo-Kachari people living in villages outside the Bodoland Territorial Region. It was formed in 2020.

History
There has been a long-standing demand for a Boro Kachari Welfare Autonomous Council outside the Bodoland territorial region for the welfare of Bodo-Kachari people. Several protests were also conducted by the Bodo organizations for this. The Bodo Kachari Welfare Autonomous Council Bill, 2020 was moved in Assam legislative assembly by the Welfare of Plain Tribes and Backward Classes Minister Chandan Brahma in December 2020 and the bill was passed after a brief discussion.

Administration
The Bodo Kachari  Autonomous Welfare Council consists of 40 members. 36 of these members are elected directly and 4 members are nominated by the State government. Among the 36 election seats,  25 of them will be reserved for the Scheduled Tribe  communities, 6 will be reserved for women of any community residing within the Council area. The 4 nominated members will be from among the communities residing within the Council area.

In January 2021, the Assam State Government said it will constitute interim councils for Bodo Kachari Autonomous Council as elections to the autonomous council can't be done before the 2021 Assam Legislative Assembly election. An interim council made up of 14 members was appointed in February 2021.

See also
Autonomous administrative divisions of India

References

External links
Bodo Kachari Welfare Autonomous Council
Bodo Kachari Welfare Autonomous Council on Facebook

Autonomous district councils of India
Local government in Assam